The Nairobi Light Rail system was announced in 2016.

A financing deal was signed with France in 2019, and the project is expected to be complete by 2021.

Routes 
The first stage is a connection between the main station of the existing narrow gauge line, with the new station of the standard gauge line now nearing completion.

Stations and stops 
 Thika Road
 Ngong Road
 Ongata Rongai
 Limuru Road

See also 
 Nairobi rail service
 Railway stations in Kenya
 Mass Rapid Transit System

References 

Rail transport in Kenya